Krishna Prema is a 1943 musical Telugu film directed by H. V. Babu.

Plot
Lord Krishna is revered by one and all in Gokulam. Radha's love for Krishna is born out of supreme Bhakthi. But her love was misunderstood by the villagers and her younger sister Chandravali. Chandravali feels that Krishna is responsible for her sister's lonely life and hates him. Chandragopa hates both Radha and Krishna and stays away from Gokulam with his wife Chandravali. Satyabhama is jealous of Radha and dislikes her. Rukmini alone understood both Radha and Krishna. Krishna himself with the help of Narada reveals the nature of divine love to these mortals.

Cast

Soundtrack
 "Dhanyulamaitimi" (Singer: Tanguturi Suryakumari)
 "Ekkadunnaave Pillaa ekkadunnaave" (Singers: Addanki and Bhanumathi)
 "Gokkula Vihaari" (Singer: Tanguturi Suryakumari)
 "Gopaalude Venugopaalude" (Singer: Tanguturi Suryakumari)
 "Jejelayyaa Johaaru Krishna" (Singer: Tanguturi Suryakumari)
 "Keleelola Krishna Gopala Leelananda Mukunda" (Singer: Tanguturi Suryakumari)
 "Nee Mahimalenna Taramaa Nikhila Lokanadha Krishna" (Singer: Tanguturi Suryakumari)
 "Nee Sari" (Singer: Tanguturi Suryakumari)
 "Oogave Oogave Uyyaalaa" (Singer: Bhanumathi Ramakrishna)
 "Paahimaam" (Singer: Tanguturi Suryakumari)
 "Raaraadaa Aatalaadi Poraadaa" (Singer: Tanguturi Suryakumari)

1961 film
The film was remade in 1961 under the direction of Adurthi Subbarao. It stars S. V. Ranga Rao, M. Balayya, S. Varalakshmi and Jamuna with music composed by Pendyala Nageswara Rao.

References

External links
 

1943 films
1940s Telugu-language films
Indian black-and-white films
Indian musical drama films
1940s musical drama films
Films scored by Gali Penchala Narasimha Rao
1943 drama films